A crystal cluster is a group of crystals which are formed in an open space environment and exhibit euhedral crystal form determined by their internal crystal structure. A cluster of small crystals coating the walls of a cavity are called druse.

See also

References

Further reading
"Mechanical and Physical Properties of Whiskers", CRC Handbook of Chemistry and Physics, 55th edition.

Crystallography
Crystals